Duaine K. Counsell (July 9, 1924 – December 24, 2007) was an American football and baseball coach.  He served as the head football coach at the University of Wisconsin–Stevens Point from 1957 to 1965 and from 1967 to 1968, compiling a record of 56–33–4.  Counsell was also the head baseball coach at Wisconsin–Stevens Point from 1959 to 1962, tallying a mark of 40–14.

Head coaching record

Football

References

1924 births
2012 deaths
Wisconsin–Stevens Point Pointers baseball coaches
Wisconsin–Stevens Point Pointers football coaches
Wisconsin–Stevens Point Pointers football players
People from Wisconsin Dells, Wisconsin
Coaches of American football from Wisconsin
Players of American football from Wisconsin
Baseball coaches from Wisconsin